Sherwood-Hillsborough was a provincial electoral district for the Legislative Assembly of Prince Edward Island, Canada. It was created for the 1996 election out of the dual member 5th Queens riding. It was divided prior to the 2007 election into Charlottetown-Sherwood, Tracadie-Hillsborough Park and Charlottetown-Parkdale.

Members
The riding elected the following Members of the Legislative Assembly:

Election results

References

Politics of Charlottetown
Former provincial electoral districts of Prince Edward Island